Złota  is a village in Pińczów County, Świętokrzyskie Voivodeship, in south-central Poland. It is the seat of the gmina (administrative district) called Gmina Złota.

The village has an approximate population of 960.

References

Villages in Pińczów County
Kielce Governorate
Kielce Voivodeship (1919–1939)